Teri Marie Moren (born April 14, 1969) is the current head coach of the Indiana University women's basketball team. Raised in Seymour, Indiana, Moren played college basketball at Purdue and was the head coach at Indianapolis from 2000-2007 and at Indiana State from 2010-2014. She became the head coach of the Indiana Hoosiers women's basketball team in 2014. 

Moren's teams have acquired many championships and accolades. Her Hoosiers won the 2018 Women's National Invitation Tournament and in 2023 she became the winningest coach in program history. As an assistant coach, Moren won a gold medal at the 2022 FIBA Under-18 Women's Americas Championship. For her success, Moren was named the 2016 and 2023 Big Ten Conference Women's Basketball Coach of the Year and inducted into the Indiana Basketball Hall of Fame in 2014.

High school playing career
Moren played high school basketball at Seymour High School, which boasts the nation's 2nd largest high school gym, playing for Indiana Hall of Fame coach Donna Sullivan. Growing up in Seymour, Moren "went to church on Sundays, to grandma's house for lunch, then watched the Bobby Knight Show and Hoosier men's basketball games."

Over the course of her high school career, Moren won four sectional championships, two regional titles, and an appearance at the 1987 state basketball finals. Her senior year, Moren set a school record of 203 field goals made and averaged 18.4 point per game. She was named a 1987 Indiana All-Star and the Columbus Republic Female Athlete of the Year. At the conclusion of her high school career, Moren tallied 1,138 career points. She was part of the inaugural class of inducted into the Seymour High School Athletics Hall of Fame in December 2017.

College playing career
Moren played collegiate basketball for the Purdue Boilermakers under coach Lin Dunn, now the Indiana Fever's general manager, and assistant Gail Goestenkors, who went on to coach Duke to four Final Four appearances. In her freshman season, 1988–89, Purdue finished 24–6, 3rd in the Big Ten, and reached the NCAA second round. In her sophomore season, 1989–90, Purdue finished 23–7, 3rd in the Big Ten, and reached the NCAA Sweet Sixteen. By Moren's junior year, the 1990-91 season, she was a consistent starter and the Boilermakers finished 26–3 overall, 1st in the Big Ten, and reached the NCAA second round. That year marked the school's first Big Ten championship. Her senior year, the 1991-92 season, the Boilermakers finished 23–7 overall, 2nd in the Big Ten, and earned a Sweet Sixteen appearance. Moren was named to the Purdue’s All-Decade team and received the Ruth Jones and Red Mackey Awards at Purdue.

Coaching career

University of Indianapolis
Moren began her head coaching career for the University of Indianapolis Greyhounds in Division II. She spent seven seasons at Indianapolis beginning in 2000-01. In her third year there, the 2002–03 season, the Greyhounds finished with an overall record of 29–3, a mark of 18–2 (1st), and reached the NCAA DII Second Round. At the conclusion of her final season with Indianapolis, the 2006–07 year, Moren carried an overall record of 130–73 (.640) and a conference record of 80–58 (.580).

Indiana State University
In her four years coaching the Indiana State Sycamores, Moren won a conference championship in 2013-14, two postseason appearances in the WNIT, and helped six players earn All-MVC honors. During her first year, the 2010-11 season, Moren won more games (16) as a first year coach than any other in Sycamore history. By her third year, the 2012-13 season, Moren’s team finished with an 18-13 record and a berth in the 2013 Women's National Invitation Tournament. In Moren's final year with the Sycamores, the 2013–14 season, her team finished with a 20-12 record and a share of the regular season Missouri Valley Conference title, only the third time in program history that ISU won a regular season conference championship and the first since 2006.

Indiana University Hoosiers
Indiana Director of Athletics Fred Glass announced Moren as head coach of the Indiana women’s basketball program on August 9, 2014. During her first year as head coach during the 2014-15 season, the Moren led Hoosiers made 236 three-point field goals, the second best total in school history at that time, and also the top five in program history in free throw percentage (4th), points scored (5th, 2,229), points per game (5th) and 3-point field goal percentage (5th, 33.1 percent). The following year, during the 2015-16 season, Moren led the Hoosiers to the most regular season wins (20) in program history to that point while also tying for overall wins (21) in a single season. Indiana captured the school's second-most Big Ten victories (12) ever and Moren earned Big Ten Coach of the Year honors. That season the Hoosiers earned the program’s first NCAA Tournament berth in 14 years and finished fourth in the Big Ten, the school's highest conference finish in 18 years. The team went a perfect 14-0 at home in Assembly Hall, marking the most home wins ever without a defeat and tying for the most overall home victories in a single year in program history.

During her third year with the program, the 2016–17 season, Moren's Hoosiers finished with an overall record of 23–11, 10–6 in Big Ten play (4th place), and a birth in the Women's National Invitation Tournament, where they advanced to the quarterfinals. The following year, the 2017–18 season, Moren's Hoosiers finished the season 23–14 overall and 9–7 in Big Ten play (4th place). They were invited to the Women's National Invitation Tournament where they advanced to the finals and defeated Virginia Tech for the championship. It marked Indiana's third-straight season winning 20 or more games. The Hoosiers also set a new single season average attendance record (4,102) and the single-game attendance record of 13,007 during the WNIT Championship game.

In her fifth season leading the program, 2018–19, the Hoosiers finished 21–13 overall and 8–10 in Big Ten play. They received an at-large bid to the 2019 NCAA women's basketball tournament where they defeated Texas in the first round before losing to Oregon in the second round. The following year, the 2019–20 season, Moren's team went 24–8 overall and 13–5 in the Big Ten (4th place). Indiana was ranked in both national polls for much of the season, including all 20 weeks of the Associated Press top 25 where it topped out at a program-record ranking of No. 12, but postseason play was cancelled due to the COVID-19 pandemic.

In her seventh year with Indiana, the 2020–21 season, the Hoosiers went 21-5 overall and 16–2 in the Big Ten (2nd place), a program record for conference wins at the time. Indiana spent most of the year highly ranked in various polls, topping out at number 9 before NCAA tournament play. In the NCAA tournament that year, the Hoosiers beat top-seeded North Carolina State in the Sweet Sixteen before losing in the Elite Eight.

Following the 2020–21 season, Indiana announced a second extension to Moren's contract with Indiana, though it had actually been signed even before the season ended. Under terms of the deal, her average annual compensation is $862,500 through the 2026-27 season. Her base salary is $375,000, plus additional compensation for outside marketing and promotion income, which starts at $425,000 in 2021 and increases in increments of $25,000 each year through the 2026-27 season. Moren also stands to earn money from bonuses, including $15,000 for winning (or tying for) the Big Ten regular season title, $15,000 for winning the Big Ten Tournament, and three months’ worth of base salary (approximately $94,000) for winning the NCAA title. The contract also contains a non-compete clause that would require Purdue to pay the school $10 million if she left to coach there. The contract makes Moren one of the top-paid coaches in the Big Ten.

In Moren's eighth year, the 2021–22 season, the Hoosiers finished 24-9 overall and 11–5 in Big Ten play. All five starters earned All-Big Ten honors in the annual postseason awards including All-Big Ten first team Grace Berger. The Hoosiers maintained a ranking inside the top 15 throughout the season, rising to as high as No. 4 in the Associated Press and No. 5 in the coaches poll. The team received a No. 3 seed in the 2021 NCAA Division I women's basketball tournament, where they advanced to the Elite Eight.

USA basketball
Moren served as an assistant coach for the gold-medal-winning Women's U18 National Team that competed at the 2022 FIBA Under-18 Women's Americas Championship. Prior to that she served as a court coach for the 2021 Women's U19 World Cup trials.

Coaching philosophy
On the court, Moren's players describe her as possessing a tough, strong philosophy that expects the most out of her players. But off the court, players describe her as open and communicable with teams that feel like a family. Moren places a priority on academics with a mantra of "Graduate. Win. Serve." With the Hoosiers, her players have earned 42 Academic All-Big Ten selections and seven CoSIDA Academic All-District honorees.

Moren said her mom wanted her to emulate Pat Summitt's coaching style: "'If you are going to be a coach, be like Coach Summitt.' You know, tough and hard-nosed but classy." All-American Hoosier Mackenzie Holmes described Moren as "a badass. . . You can see her passion, her competitiveness, her energy, every single game and it doesn't change. It's infectious."

Personal life
A couple months after Moren took the Indiana job, her mom Barbara died from ALS. Hoosier women's basketball became her siblings and father's sanctuary. Moren is a big fan of fellow Seymour native John Mellencamp. She said his music reminds Indiana natives that they may go anywhere in the world, but "you can find your way back. There's something about being able to do what we've done here with the support of the people that have watched you grow up."

Head coaching record

References

External links

1969 births
Living people
American women's basketball coaches
Basketball coaches from Indiana
Basketball players from Indiana
Butler Bulldogs women's basketball coaches
Georgia Tech Yellow Jackets women's basketball coaches
Indiana Hoosiers women's basketball coaches
Indianapolis Greyhounds women's basketball coaches
Northwestern Wildcats women's basketball coaches
People from Seymour, Indiana
Purdue Boilermakers women's basketball players